Shumikha is a rural locality (also called a selo) in Togulsky Selsoviet, Togulsky District, Altai Krai, Russia. The population was 77 as of 2013. There are 6 streets.

Geography 
Shumikha is located on the Togul River, 27 km north of Togul (the district's administrative centre) by road. Novoiushino is the nearest rural locality.

References 

Rural localities in Togulsky District